Joseph Michael Haik is a former professional American football player who played wide receiver for four seasons for the Houston Oilers in the American Football League (1968–1969) and the National Football League (1970–1971).  He is CEO/Chairman of Mac Haik Enterprises which owns land, restaurants, commercial office buildings and a chain of automobile dealerships. Haik is of Lebanese American descent.

Mac Haik Enterprises
Mac Haik Enterprises, inc. is an investment company based in Houston, Texas with multiple affiliated companies engaged in a broad range of services and industries. It employs over 3,250 associates and owns land, commercial office buildings, retail space, medical facilities, restaurants, hotels, outdoor media and a chain of automobile dealerships located in Texas and Mississippi that generate revenues in excess of $3.3 billion a year.

Vehicles
Mac Haik Enterprises' automotive division, Mac Haik Automotive Group, sells cars, trucks, and SUVs from the following manufacturers:
Chevrolet
Chrysler
Dodge
Fiat
Ford
Hyundai
Jeep
Lincoln
Ram Trucks
Toyota

Mac Haik Peacock
The Mac Haik Peacock is a mascot of the Mac Haik Automotive Group division of Mac Haik Enterprises, Inc., that many people would say is very similar to the NBC Peacock, due to its rainbow tail feathers.  The origin of the "Mac Haik Peacock" goes back to his first car dealership.  In 1983, he bought Tom Peacock Chevrolet.  In order to keep the goodwill of Tom Peacock Chevrolet, the new dealership was called Mac Haik's Peacock Chevrolet for 5 years.  After the 5-year period was up Mac Haik kept the Peacock logo. Tom Peacock's peacock mascot was also cited as similar to NBC's peacock.

References

1946 births
Living people
Sportspeople from Meridian, Mississippi
American football wide receivers
Ole Miss Rebels football players
Houston Oilers players
American Football League players
American automobile salespeople
Businesspeople from Mississippi
American people of Lebanese descent
Sportspeople of Lebanese descent